Shri Hari Ram Saboo Public School is an English language-medium co-educational secondary school in the locality of Subhash Nagar in Jaipur, India.

The school is run under the Shri Hari Ram Saboo Charitable Trust, established by Shri Hari Ram Saboo. The foundation stone was laid in 1981. It was inaugurated by the industrialist and philanthropist Shri Ganga Prasad Birla on 21 February 1985 and began operating in July 1985. It is affiliated to the Central Board of Secondary Education.

References

Schools in Jaipur